Samuel James Gallagher (born 15 September 1995) is an English footballer who plays as a striker for Blackburn Rovers. Originally a member of the Plymouth Argyle youth academy, Gallagher joined Southampton in 2012 and earned a call-up to the first team at the beginning of the 2013–14 season. He spent the 2017–18 season on loan to EFL Championship club Birmingham City.

Club career
Gallagher was born in Crediton, Devon, and originally played for the Plymouth Argyle youth academy.

Southampton
In April 2012 he joined Southampton amidst reported interest from fellow Premier League clubs Everton and Newcastle United. The striker made his debut for the Southampton first team on 6 November 2013 in the League Cup against Sunderland, coming on as a 79th-minute substitute for Gastón Ramírez. He later scored a second-half hat-trick against local rivals Portsmouth in a 7–0 victory in the FA Youth Cup in December. Gallagher continued to make semi-regular substitute appearances for the first team, before scoring his first senior goal against Championship side Yeovil Town in the FA Cup on 25 January 2014. He made his full senior debut for the club on 28 January when he started in a league match against leaders Arsenal, coming close to scoring his first league goal on a number of occasions. He scored his first Premier League goal on 15 March 2014, in a 4–2 win against Norwich City. On 10 May 2014, Gallagher was awarded a long-term contract extension with the Saints until the summer of 2018.

Following his successful loan to Blackburn Rovers, Gallagher signed a new improved four-year contract with Southampton on 1 July 2017.

Milton Keynes Dons (loan)
On 29 July 2015, Gallagher joined Championship side Milton Keynes Dons on a season-long loan. Gallagher made his debut for MK Dons in a 4–1 win away to Rotherham United on 8 August, providing an assist within four minutes. On 6 January 2016, having failed to score in 15 appearances, he was recalled by Southampton.

Blackburn Rovers (loan)
On 11 August 2016, Gallagher joined Championship side Blackburn Rovers on a season-long loan deal. He scored his first goal for Blackburn in a 2–2 draw with Burton Albion on 20 August. On 20 October, Blackburn's manager, Owen Coyle, expressed his desire to sign Gallagher on a permanent contract, after he scored five goals from nine starting appearances. He finished the season with 12 goals from 47 appearances11 from 43 in the leagueas Blackburn were relegated to League One.

Birmingham City (loan)
Gallagher joined another Championship club, Birmingham City, on 21 August 2017 on loan for the 2017–18 season. As one of 13 new arrivals in a squad whose manager, Harry Redknapp, was sacked a few weeks later, Gallagher had an unsettling start to the season. He made his debut on 26 August playing as a lone striker in Birmingham's 2–0 home defeat against Reading; according to the Birmingham Mail reporter, he "was totally starved of service". His first goal, deflected off defender Michael Dawson in stoppage time in a 6–1 loss at Hull City with incoming manager Steve Cotterill watching from the stands, took nine appearances to arrive. He welcomed Cotterill's fitness regime, and accepted that team selection would be based on the likelihood of those selected being able to make an impact. Amid speculation that the club might try to end his loan early, he was given a chance on the winga position he had played with Blackburnafter Isaac Vassell sustained a long-term injury.

He was then moved into the centre, and on 16 December, in a 2–1 defeat at home to Queens Park Rangers, he was the Birmingham Mail man of the match, albeit in a poor team performance, as he touched home the rebound from Maikel Kieftenbeld's shot as well as making a contribution defensively. Gallagher opened the scoring in the next match, away to Sunderland, and was sent off for two yellow cardsone for simulation, the second for a foulas Birmingham held on for a draw. After serving his one-match ban, the scoring spree continued with a goal in four of the six matches up to the end of Januarytwo wins and a draw in the league, and the only goal of the FA Cup third-round tie against Burton Albionbut then the goals dried up. When Garry Monk took over in early March, he used Gallagher from the bench in his first match and partnering Lukas Jutkiewicz in a two-man attack in the next, after which a calf injury kept him out until the last three matches of the season. He was a substitute in the first two, and started alongside Jutkiewicz in the last, a 3–1 win at home to Fulham that ensured Championship survival. His six goals made him the team's top league goalscorer.

Blackburn Rovers
On 13 July 2019, Gallagher joined Blackburn Rovers on a four-year deal for an undisclosed fee.

International career
Gallagher has a Glaswegian father, and played three games for Scotland at under-19 level. In February 2014 shortly after his father's death, Gallagher switched allegiance to his birth country, England. On 24 February 2014, he was called up by the England under-19s for a friendly match against Turkey. He made his debut in the game, which England won 3–0.

Club statistics

Honours
Southampton U21
 U21 Premier League Cup: 2014–15

See also
List of sportspeople who competed for more than one nation

References

External links
Southampton F.C. profile.

England profile at The FA

1995 births
Living people
People from Crediton
Footballers from Devon
Scottish footballers
Scotland youth international footballers
English footballers
England youth international footballers
Association football forwards
Southampton F.C. players
Milton Keynes Dons F.C. players
Blackburn Rovers F.C. players
Birmingham City F.C. players
Premier League players
English Football League players
English people of Scottish descent